
Gmina Biskupiec is an urban-rural gmina (administrative district) in Olsztyn County, Warmian-Masurian Voivodeship, in northern Poland.

Villages
Apart from the town of Biskupiec, Gmina Biskupiec contains the villages and settlements of Adamowo, Biesówko, Biesowo, Biskupiec-Kolonia Druga, Biskupiec-Kolonia Pierwsza, Biskupiec-Kolonia Trzecia, Boreczek, Borki Wielkie, Botowo, Bredynki, Bukowa Góra, Chmielówka, Czerwonka, Dębowo, Droszewo, Dworzec, Dymer, Gęsikowo, Januszewo, Józefowo, Kamionka, Kobułty, Kojtryny, Kramarka, Łabuchy, Labuszewo, Łąka Dymerska, Lipowo, Mojtyny, Najdymowo, Nasy, Nowe Marcinkowo, Parleza Mała, Parleza Wielka, Pierwój, Pudląg, Rasząg, Rozwady, Rudziska, Rukławki, Rzeck, Sadłowo, Sadowo, Stanclewo, Stryjewo, Węgój, Wilimy, Wólka Wielka, Zabrodzie, Zameczek, Zarębiec, Zawada and Zazdrość.

Neighbouring gminas
Gmina Biskupiec is bordered by the gminas of Barczewo, Dźwierzuty, Jeziorany, Kolno and Sorkwity.

References
Polish official population figures 2006

Biskupiec
Gmina Biskupiec

de:Biskupiec#Gmina Biskupiec